Utaibito Hane (唄人羽) is a Japanese male folk band. Its members are Shinichi Yasuoka and Tetsuro Honda. In 1998 they met each other and formed Hane. Afterwards they changed its name Utaibito Hane. Performing many times on the street in Fukuoka, they succeeded in winning popularity. Therefore, they came out with the song "Chiisana Hoshi no Chiisana Tabibito" in 1999. Their song "Mi Title" is the first ending of the anime Hungry Heart: Wild Striker.

Members 
 Shinichi Yasuoka (安岡信一, b. May 25, 1977)
 Tetsuro Honda (本多哲郎, b. August 2, 1979)

Discography

Singles

Albums

External links 
 Official Web Site of Utaibito Hane(Japanese) 

Japanese pop music groups
1998 establishments in Japan
Musical groups established in 1998
Musical groups from Fukuoka Prefecture